Tauranac  is a surname which may refer to:
John Tauranac (born 1939), American writer
Ron Tauranac (1925–2020), British-Australian racing car designer